Lymm Baptist Church is a Baptist Church situated in the village of Lymm near Warrington, Cheshire, England, located on the main A56 road. It opened in 1850. There is a congregation of around 200 people.

The minister since 2015 has been Rev Jonathan Bramwell. The previous minister, Rev Chris Newton, served from 1994 to 2014.

References

External links
Lymm Baptist Church website

Baptist churches in Cheshire
Religious organizations established in 1850
1850 establishments in England
Churches in Warrington